Cumnock and New Cumnock  is one of the nine electoral wards of East Ayrshire Council. Created in 2007, the ward elects four councillors using the single transferable vote electoral system and covers an area with a population of 13,210 people.

The area is a Labour stronghold with the party holding three of the four seats between in 2007 and 2017. Support for the party fell in 2017 with only one councillor elected but it recovered in 2022 and the party currently holds half the seats.

Boundaries
The ward was created following the Fourth Statutory Reviews of Electoral Arrangements ahead of the 2007 Scottish local elections. As a result of the Local Governance (Scotland) Act 2004, local elections in Scotland would use the single transferable vote electoral system from 2007 onwards so Cumnock and New Cumnock was formed from an amalgamation of several previous first-past-the-post wards. It contained all of the former Cumnock East, Cumnock West, New Cumnock wards as well as part of the former Ochiltree, Skares, Netherthird and Craigen, Drongan, Stair and Rankinston, Auchinleck, Dalmellington and Mauchline wards. Cumnock and New Cumnock lies in the southeast of the council area next to its border with Dumfries and Galloway and takes in the towns of Cumnock, New Cumnock and Ochiltree. Following the Fifth Statutory Reviews of Electoral Arrangements ahead of the 2017 Scottish local elections, the ward's boundaries were not changed.

Councillors

Election results

2022 election

2017 election

2012 election

2007 election

References

Wards of East Ayrshire
Cumnock
New Cumnock